The Babylon Bee is a conservative Christian news satire website that publishes satirical articles on topics including religion, politics, current events, and public figures. It has been referred to as a Christian, evangelical, or conservative version of The Onion.

History

The Babylon Bee was created by Adam Ford and was launched on March 1, 2016. It is headquartered on 110 Front Street, Suite 300, in Jupiter, Florida, and employs around 24 people across the United States. According to Seth Michael Dillon, the current owner of The Babylon Bee, Ford launched the website "because there was this massive void on the right for comedy that wasn't cheesy". Shortly after launching, The Babylon Bee made headlines for mocking the "health and wealth" theology of Jan Crouch, co-founder of Trinity Broadcasting Network, on the day of her death.

In 2017, Hurricane Harvey battered Houston, Texas, causing widespread flooding. In that context, The Babylon Bee satirically criticized televangelist Joel Osteen with a headline that read: "Joel Osteen Sails Luxury Yacht Through Flooded Houston to Pass Out Copies Of Your Best Life Now". The article went viral, prompting a fact check from Snopes.

In late 2018, Ford sold the website to Seth Dillon, whom Ford described as "a successful businessman who uses his resources for Kingdom purposes". In a public announcement published on his personal website, Ford cited several reasons for the sale, including his discomfort with the power wielded by social media companies like Facebook over creators and their perceived anti-conservative and anti-Christian bias. Just think about that". At the time of the website's sale, Kyle Mann, who had been head writer since September 2016, became editor-in-chief. Dillon later described the sale as "an exciting opportunity to do something different and more impactful and fun, and would bring me full circle to that whole satire and writing thing I wanted to do." As of 2021, Ford still had a financial stake in The Babylon Bee.

In 2019, The Babylon Bee satirically criticized Donald Trump with an article saying that Trump claimed he had "done more for Christianity than Jesus". The article went viral, prompting a fact check from Snopes after some thought the article was a real story. In September 2021, Trump actually said in an interview, "Nobody has done more for Christianity, or for evangelicals, or for religion itself than I have."

At the time of its sale to Dillon, The Babylon Bee was receiving 3million page views per month. In October 2020, the website said that it was receiving about 8M visitors a month. In January 2021, The Washington Times said that The Babylon Bee was receiving more than 20M page views per month, had more than 20,000 paid subscribers, and had a Twitter account with more than 856,000 followers. In January 2022, The Economist said that The Babylon Bee was "claiming as many as 25M readers a month at its peak", and that Dillon had turned The Babylon Bee "into one of the most popular conservative sites after Fox News".  During this period the Bee had several articles which had higher page views than The Onions normal monthly site traffic of 3.5M. Articles such as "NBA Players Wear Special Lace Collars to Honor Ruth Bader Ginsburg", "Motorcyclist Who Identifies as Bicyclist Sets Cycling World Record", and "Trump: 'I Have Done More For Christianity Than Jesus'" each received more than 3.5M page views.

In July 2021, Dillon spoke at Turning Point USA's Student Action Summit in Tampa, Florida about misinformation and The Babylon Bee. In April 2022, Dillon announced a partnership with the person behind the Twitter account Libs of TikTok after The Washington Post further publicized the account's identity.

Content
The Babylon Bee takes the tone and format of a traditional news publication. The site began by lampooning a wide range of topics including progressives, Democrats, Republicans, Christians, and Donald Trump. The purpose of the site, according to its founder Adam Ford in 2016, was not just to evoke laughter, but to give cause for self-reflection. "It's important to look at what we're doing, to 'examine ourselves.' Satire acts like an overhead projector, taking something that people usually ignore and projecting it up on the wall for everyone to see. It forces us to look at things we wouldn't normally look at and makes us ask if we're okay with them". E.J. Dickson wrote in Rolling Stone in 2020 that The Babylon Bee "initially started out as something of an equal opportunity offender" in the topics it satirized. In an April 2016 Washington Post profile of the site and its founder, Bob Smietana observed that "The Bee excels at poking fun at the small idiosyncrasies of believers, especially evangelical Protestants". Susan E. Isaacs publishing in Christianity Today wrote in May 2018 that the site "lampoon[ed] the faithful across denominations, political affiliations, and age groups". Emma Green in The Atlantic noted of The Babylon Bees content in October 2021, "although political humor drives much of The Bees web traffic, the publication's signature hits focus on what the writers see as shallowness in the evangelical world".

In the years leading up to 2020, the site grew less critical of Trump and more critical of the left and liberalism, though it continued to satirize topics across both parties. Emma Goldberg of The New York Times said in 2020 that although Trump was still not off-limits as a target for the Bee, "their "early coverage of Trump, back in 2016, was much more vitriolic than today's. They called him a psychopath, or a megalomaniac. Now they're more bemused by him and the ghoulish ways he's described on the left". In another 2020 New York Times article, Emma Goldberg wrote that the unifying goal of the site was "poking fun at the left", and that "their most popular articles are often those making jokes at the expense of Democratic presidential candidate Joe Biden". She wrote that its success was due to finding ways to punch up by "ridiculing every source of authority outside the White House." In the same article, The Babylon Bees editor-in-chief Kyle Mann summarized how he believed readers of The Babylon Bee considered the site: "this comedy makes fun of everybody, but it's a little harder on the left, and when it makes fun of the right it's not hateful." Parker J. Bach wrote in Slate in June 2021 that the site frequently makes jokes that target marginalized groups, with articles that are "often 'ironically' misogynistic" and "frequently antagonistic toward the LGBTQIA+ community". In an October 2021 interview with The Atlantic, Mann described the site's view of satire and its mission as "mock[ing] people who hold cultural power and... communicat[ing] truth to a culture that many times does not believe in an objective, universal truth any longer."

The Babylon Bees influence led to their podcast interview of Elon Musk in December 2021. This podcast featured the usual hosts Kyle Mann and Ethan Nicolle, as well as an uncommon appearance by Seth Dillon. The podcast covered a wide range of topics, ranging from a response to Senator Elizabeth Warren's criticism of the amount of taxes paid by Musk to current sex scandals at CNN to his thoughts on Christianity.

Jennifer Graham of Deseret News attributed the success of The Babylon Bee to its benefiting "from the increasing polarization in America, with Republicans and Democrats clustering in information silos that reflect and affirm their beliefs."

Nick Gillespie of Reason praised The Babylon Bee, saying that "The fact that the Bee is very funny, day in and day out, is almost enough to get me, a lapsed Catholic, to believe in divine intervention, if not a covenant of grace not works."

Mistaken for factual reporting 
As the readership of The Babylon Bee increased from 2016 to 2020, there were independent, ongoing discussions within journalistic circles on how to handle the rise of fake news and its influence on the public. The Babylon Bee was brought into this wider conversation when several of their articles were shared on social media or reported upon, ostensibly as factual, including President Donald Trump commenting on a story that claimed "Twitter Shuts Down Entire Network To Slow Spread Of Negative Biden News" and British newspaper The Guardian reprinting as factual a Bee-doctored image of LeBron James wearing a lace collar supposedly in tribute to Ruth Bader Ginsburg.

The Conversation published research by academics at the Ohio State University in August 2019 that found that people regularly mistook satirical reports from The Babylon Bee, The Colbert Report, The Onion, and others for genuine news. They found that "stories published by the Bee were among the most shared factually inaccurate content in almost every survey we conducted". They also found that both Republicans and Democrats mistook articles from The Babylon Bee as news, but Republicans were considerably more likely to do so. The Babylon Bee's editor-in-chief, Kyle Mann, criticized the research in a conversation with ReasonTV, describing it as "methodologically flawed" and saying The Conversation reworded the headlines and took them out of context when asking survey respondents if they thought they were real. Reason's John Osterhoudt said that the headlines had been "stripped of both context and comedy", giving as an example The Babylon Bee headline "CNN: 'God Allowed the Mueller Report to Test Our Shakeable Faith in Collusion'" that was rephrased to participants as "CNN news anchor Anderson Cooper said his belief that Trump colluded with Russia is unshakable; it will not change regardless of statements or evidence to the contrary".

Media outlets' responses to incidents in which The Babylon Bees content was mistaken for factual reporting have varied. Some have described The Babylon Bee and its content as obviously satirical, whereas others have suggested the site misleads its readers, either intentionally or inadvertently. The frequency with which Babylon Bee stories are confused with real news has resulted in numerous reactions from fact-checkers.

In October 2020, a satirical news story by The Babylon Bee claiming that Twitter had been shut down to protect Joe Biden from negative coverage was retweeted by then-U.S. President Donald Trump, who, according to some journalists, seemed to not realize the article was parody and condemned the fabricated incident described in the story as a case of leftist censorship. This event prompted Kevin Roose, writing in The New York Times, to question whether The Babylon Bee "traffic[s] in misinformation under the guise of comedy", concluding that "The Babylon Bee is not a covert disinformation operation disguised as a right-wing satire site, and is in fact trying to do comedy, but may inadvertently be spreading bad information when people take their stories too seriously". When asked about the retweet by Fox News' Media Angle, Dillon said "He's just doing what he does. We know from people close to him that he's a fan of the Bee and enjoys our satire."

Parker J. Bach wrote in Slate that "the site is adept at writing ironically ambiguous material that lets audiences from different sections of the right reinforce their own beliefs... even if The Babylon Bee's satire itself should not be considered misinformation, its satire draws on and reinforces actual misinformation and conspiracy" also describing their material as "riffs on riffs, building referential jokes atop the already referential right-wing commentary about the untrustworthiness of the news". James Varney wrote in The Washington Times that "Surprisingly often, a short piece from the Bee seems to become real news. A jesting report in the Bee will be fact-checked and censored, usually briefly, by social media platforms" and that "as a consequence, the satirical website has been fondly christened by its conservative blogging brethren as 'the paper of record. As of 2022, Dillon's Instagram account described The Babylon Bee as "the world’s most trusted, factually accurate news source."

Social media and other platforms 
On several occasions, social media and other platforms have removed content by The Babylon Bee or flagged or suspended its accounts, though some of these actions were later described by the platforms as errors and reversed.

In March 2018, after The Babylon Bees article about CNN "spinning" the news in a large washing machine was classified by fact-checking website Snopes as "false", Facebook sent a notification threatening to limit the Bees content distribution and monetization. Following some controversy, Facebook identified the notification as a mistake and apologized.

The Babylon Bees Twitter account was briefly suspended in August 2020 after being mistakenly caught in one of the social media company's spam filters.

In October 2020, The Babylon Bee put up a Facebook post linking to a story about the Amy Coney Barrett Supreme Court nomination, with the headline "Senator Hirono Demands ACB Be Weighed Against a Duck to See If She Is a Witch" (a reference to the 1975 film Monty Python and the Holy Grail). Citing its policies against incitement to violence, Facebook removed the post and demonetized The Babylon Bees page on the social media platform. Dillon responded, "In what universe does a fictional quote as part of an obvious joke constitute a genuine incitement to violence? How does context not come into play here? They're asking us to edit the article and not speak publicly about internal content reviews."

Dillon criticized Facebook in June 2021 after the company announced that it would moderate satire that "punches down". He responded that "we're not punching down. We're punching back." The same month, Mailchimp suspended The Babylon Bees account. The company later said that this had been an error, but Dillon announced that the Bee would no longer use Mailchimp's services.

In August 2021, after a drop in website traffic referred from Facebook, Dillon accused the social media platform of throttling the reach of The Babylon Bee.

The Babylon Bee put up a Facebook post in February 2022 with the headline "Trans Woman Breaks Jeopardy Record, Proving Once and for All That Men Are Smarter Than Women", referencing former Jeopardy! champion Amy Schneider. Facebook removed the post, citing its policies against hate speech. Dillon responded, "Remember how Facebook recently rolled out new rules stipulating that 'real satire' cannot 'punch down'? Are they really willing to say that defending women against a male takeover of their records is 'punching down' and – even worse – 'hate speech'? We're going to find out".

Dillon has accused news media, fact-checking outlets, and social media websites of targeting The Babylon Bee in a movement to deplatform conservative or Christian viewpoints, which he has also described as "cancel culture". In October 2020, Senator Mike Lee referred to The Babylon Bee as a target of social media moderation, which he said was imbalanced and predominantly directed at right-leaning content, groups, and individuals. The Babylon Bee and Not the Bee filed an amicus brief in support of Florida's Senate Bill 7072, also known as the Stop Social Media Censorship Act, which seeks to "protect users by prohibiting social media sites from censoring or deplatforming people or organizations they disagree with". In the brief, both organizations said they had experienced censorship from large social media platforms.

Controversies

Snopes
In March 2018, The Babylon Bee published an article quipping that CNN was using an industrial-sized washing machine to "spin" the news. Two days later, fact-checking website Snopes issued a fact check for the article, rating it "false". Facebook then cited this fact check in a warning message to The Babylon Bee, threatening to limit their content distribution and monetization. Ford tweeted a screenshot of the warning message to his followers, drawing public attention to the matter. Facebook quickly apologized, with the statement that "there's a difference between false news and satire. This was a mistake and should not have been rated false in our system. It's since been corrected and won't count against the domain in any way". Snopes later issued a fact-check of its previous fact-check, saying that "it should have been obvious that the Babylon Bee piece was just a spoof."

In July 2019, The Babylon Bee published an article referring to a real-world incident, titled "Georgia Lawmaker Claims Chick-Fil-A Employee Told Her to Go Back to Her Country, Later Clarifies He Actually Said 'My Pleasure'", which Snopes rated "false". They also suggested that the article was deliberately deceptive, rather than genuinely satirical. Ford responded on Twitter, highlighting what he deemed to be problematic wording in the fact-check. The Babylon Bee also released a statement, calling the fact-check a "smear" that was "both dishonest and disconcerting". The statement concluded by saying a law firm had been retained to represent The Babylon Bee because "Snopes appears to be actively engaged in an effort to discredit and deplatform us". After receiving some backlash and a formal demand letter from The Babylon Bees attorney, Snopes made revisions to the wording of the fact check and added an explanatory editor's note.

The Babylon Bees chief executive, Seth Dillon, appeared on Fox News in August 2019 to discuss the incident. He said The Babylon Bee must take the matter seriously "because social networks, which we depend on for our traffic, have relied upon fact-checking sources in the past to determine what's fake news and what isn't. In cases where [Snopes] is calling us fake news and lumping us in with them rather than saying this is satire, that could actually damage us. It could put our business in jeopardy".

Snopes co-founder David Mikkelson acknowledged to The New York Times that their fact-check was poorly written, but denied trying to discredit The Babylon Bee. In an interview with BuzzFeed News, Mikkelson stated, "The question you should be asking is not: 'why is Snopes addressing material from a particular site so often?' But, 'what is it about that site that makes its content trigger the fact-check threshold?'"

In August 2019, Snopes announced a new rating for satire sites called "labeled satire". Articles from The Babylon Bee that were previously rated "false" were updated with the new rating. Snopes explains the label: "This rating indicates that a claim is derived from content described by its creator and/or the wider audience as satire. Not all content described by its creator or audience as 'satire' necessarily constitutes satire, and this rating does not make a distinction between 'real' satire and content that may not be effectively recognized or understood as satire despite being labeled as such". Mann objected to this label in an op-ed published in The Wall Street Journal, writing that the label "is meant to suggest that we are somehow making jokes in bad faith".

The New York Times
In June 2021, Dillon threatened legal action against The New York Times, alleging that the newspaper had defamed The Babylon Bee by referring to it as a "far-right misinformation site" in a March 2021 article. The Times first amended the article, then removed the descriptor and published a clarification about the labeling dispute between Snopes and The Babylon Bee.

Twitter ban 
On March 20, 2022, The Babylon Bees Twitter account was suspended for tweeting "The Babylon Bees Man of the Year Is Rachel Levine", referencing the U.S. Assistant Secretary for Health, a transgender woman. Twitter said that the post violated its policy on "hateful conduct". Dillon refused to delete the tweet in order to regain access to the account, stating, "They could, of course, delete the tweet themselves. But they won't. It's not enough for them to just wipe it out. They want us to bend the knee and admit that we engaged in hateful conduct". On March 23, Twitter rejected an appeal by The Babylon Bee. Dillon told Fox News Digital that the Bee was "disappointed" by the rejection, adding, "It doesn't change our position. They can delete our joke if they want. They have that power. But we're not bending the knee and doing it for them". Mann was also locked out of his personal account after tweeting, "Maybe they'll let us back into our Twitter account if we throw a few thousand Uighurs in a concentration camp", referring to the way in which Twitter handled accounts associated with the Chinese government. Mann has denied allegations of transphobia, saying "We love trans people", and "We don't consider people like that beneath us. You know, the Christian worldview is that everybody has the opportunity to be saved and we can love everybody. I'm no more deserving of God's grace than a transgender person is. But when the culture bows down and starts handing out trophies to people for stuff like this is when we say, 'Hey, wait a minute, you know, we need to protect women in our society as well.

In a statement to The Washington Post on April 4, 2022, Dillon revealed that Elon Musk had contacted The Babylon Bee shortly after its Twitter account was suspended. "He wanted to confirm that we had, in fact, been suspended from Twitter. He reached out to us before he publicly asked his Twitter followers if they think Twitter 'rigorously adheres' to the principle of free expression. He even mused on that call with us that he might need to buy Twitter." Dillon added, "I wouldn't suggest that The Babylon Bee is the sole reason Musk decided to take action", but "I do think the absurdity of his favorite satire site getting suspended factored into his decision. Perhaps it was the last straw." Musk has long promoted the Babylon Bees presence on Twitter, citing it over its competitor, The Onion. It was later revealed that Musk's ex-wife Talulah Riley had encouraged Musk to purchase Twitter specifically citing the Bees ban. On April 14, Musk made a formal offer to buy Twitter, which was accepted on April 25.

Bill Maher also reacted to The Babylon Bees Twitter suspension, making statements on several outlets that the social media company's editorial policies had "failed". He highlighted Twitter's reaction to the Wuhan lab leak posts and the Hunter Biden laptop story, as well as its labeling as "sensitive content" a Babylon Bee video satirizing Twitter employees as being overly sensitive.

Musk officially acquired Twitter on October 27, directing the Trust and Safety team to urgently reinstate the Bees account. Musk saw the Bees suspension as emblematic of the partisan, predominantly liberal, moderation overreach that had prompted him to acquire Twitter.

In a conference with his lawyer, Alex Spiro and Trust and Safety lead Yoel Roth (who resigned following the release of the Twitter Files which detailed his role in, in part, in banning accounts like the Babylon Bee), Musk described the tweet as "not cool", but not rising to the level of violent threats that should govern moderation. Roth objected, with Musk relenting until a new content policy could be published.

Amongst discussions with advertisers and restructuring of the company, Musk reinstated several long-banned accounts, including the Babylon Bee, on 18 November 2022.

Books 
The Babylon Bee published a book satirizing the Christian self-help industry, titled How to Be a Perfect Christian: Your Comprehensive Guide to Flawless Spiritual Living. Founder Adam Ford retained ownership of the book when he sold The Babylon Bee.

In November 2020, The Babylon Bee released a self-published collection of their greatest hits, titled The Sacred Texts of The Babylon Bee, Volume 1.

In 2021, Mann and Joel Berry, The Babylon Bee's managing editor, published The Babylon Bee Guide to Wokeness. In the first week after publication, it ranked 20th on Amazon's top seller list, 22nd on USA Todays top seller list, and 2nd on Publishers Weeklys bestsellers list. On NPD Bookscan (formerly Nielsen Bookscan), it reached the Number 2 spot among top-selling Christian books.

In September 2022, The Babylon Bee released a book satirizing democracy in the United States, titled The Babylon Bee Guide to Democracy.

Not the Bee
Dillon and Ford, along with Dan Dillon, launched the website Not the Bee on September 1, 2020. The content on Not the Bee is not satirical. The website instead publishes strange news stories and commentary, and hosts a social media platform. Seth Dillon has described it as "a humor-based entertainment site that offers commentary on stories that are so outrageous they should be satire, but somehow aren't".

See also
 List of satirical news websites
 Libs of TikTok (also supported by Seth Dillon)

References

External links
 

2010s in comedy
2016 establishments in Florida
2020s in comedy
American companies established in 2016
American conservative websites
American satirical websites
Christian websites
Companies based in Palm Beach County, Florida
Conservative media in the United States
Internet properties established in 2016
Jupiter, Florida
Religious comedy websites